Barker and Stonehouse is a British independent furniture retailer. It is a family-run firm since 1946 and was established in Stockton, County Durham.

Barker and Stonehouse stock a range furniture including sofas, beds, dining tables and chairs, office furniture and children's furniture as well as designer brands such as Timothy Oulton, Stressless, Tempur and Ercol.

It has eleven branches, situated in Newcastle upon Tyne, Gateshead, Darlington, Knaresborough, Hull, Leeds, Nottingham, Battersea and Thornaby. Hove, opened in April 2017. The newest store in Guildford was opened in December 2017.

History 

Barker and Stonehouse was founded during the second world war by Charles Barker and Alex Stonehouse. The two RAF men decided to embark on their new business venture when they returned home, opening the first Barker & Stonehouse store in Bishopton Lane, Stockton, in early 1946.

They were joined by Charles’ brother, Frank Barker, in late 1946 when the first Middlesbrough store opened in Newport Road. This was followed by the Darlington store in 1953. In 1960, Charles Barker's son, and current chairman, Richard Barker, joined the company. Richard Barker went on to effect a management buy-out, acquiring Frank Barker's and Alex Stonehouse's shares making him majority shareholder and managing director of the business in 1974. A store in Bishop Auckland was opened in 1979, followed by a store in Newcastle upon Tyne in 1982.

In 1991, Richard's son, James, the current managing director, brought his own ideas to the business when he joined the company. James recognised the power of advertising, and launched the slogan "is your house a Barker & Stonehouse?"

Locations

Thornaby

Barker and Stonehouse's flagship store is located on Haydock Park Road in Teesside Retail Park, Thornaby. Opened in 2015 with special guest Mary Berry, the furniture store has an eco-friendly design, made from reclaimed materials and featuring a living wall with a self-sufficient water irrigation system. In-store café Chadwick & Co is located on the second floor.

Darlington
Barker and Stonehouse Darlington is located on Victoria Road in the Feethams area of the town.

Newcastle
Located in Strawberry Buildings on Leazes Park Road, Barker and Stonehouse's Newcastle upon Tyne store opened in 1998 within a former print works, creating 60,000 sq. ft. of retail space.

Gateshead
Barker and Stonehouse's Gateshead store is located on the Metro Retail Park, next to the Metro Centre. The 26,000 sq ft showroom is arranged over two floors.

Knaresborough

Barker and Stonehouse Knaresborough opened in 2012. It features low energy heating, an energy-saving lighting system and a living roof garden for wildlife and insects. The store is also home to Stanley's Coffee House & Kitchen.

Leeds
The Leeds Barker and Stonehouse store is located in the West Yorkshire Retail Park on Geldherd Road, Birstall and has two floors of furniture.

Hull
Barker and Stonehouse Hull is located in the St Andrews Quay retail park.

Nottingham
The Barker and Stonehouse Nottingham store is located on Giltbrook Retail Park, Ikea Way.

London Battersea
Barker and Stonehouse opened their first London store in 2013. The Battersea showroom is located inside an old candle factory, at 100 York Road.

Hove

Located at 184–186 Old Shoreham Road, Barker and Stonehouse Hove opened in 2017 and is the largest furniture store on the south coast with 35,000 sq ft of retail space. The store was officially opened by TV's George Clarke.

Guildford
Barker and Stonehouse opened their latest store in Ladymead, Guildford in 2017. The showroom has 42,000 sq. ft. of furniture spread over two floors as well as a cafe, the Queensbury Coffee House.

References

External links

 Barker and Stonehouse official website

Furniture retailers of the United Kingdom
British companies established in 1946
Companies based in Middlesbrough
Retail companies of England
1946 establishments in England
Retail companies established in 1946